Fant may refer to:

People
Christer Fant (born 1953), Swedish actor
Claes-Göran Fant (born 1951), Swedish Army officer
Gene Fant Jr. (born 1963), American religious scholar and author
George Fant (1916–1998), Swedish actor, director and theater manager
George Fant (American football) (born 1992), American American football player
Gunnar Fant (1919–2009)
Jay Fant (born 1968), American politician
Kenne Fant (1923–2016), Swedish actor, director, and writer
Kevin Fant (born 1980), American American football player
Lou Fant (1931–2001), American teacher
Noah Fant (born 1997), American American football player
Phylicia Fant, American music executive

Places
Fant, a ward in Maidstone, Kent, England

Other
Fant (film) (1937)
FANT, Forces Armées Nationales Tchadiennes, the Chadian National Armed Forces
Fant v. The City of Ferguson
Fant-Asia or Fantasia International Film Festival-Asia
Fant Broadcasting, taken over by The Outlet Company